Castries  is the capital and largest city of Saint Lucia, an island country in the Caribbean. The urban area has a population of approximately 20,000, while the eponymous district has a population of 70,000, as at May 2013.

Castries is on a flood plain and is built on reclaimed land. It houses the seat of government and the head offices of many foreign and local businesses. The city is laid out in a grid pattern. Its sheltered harbour receives cargo vessels, ferries and cruise ships. It houses duty-free shopping facilities such as Point Seraphine and La Place Carenage. The city is well served by a bus system and taxi service. St Lucia's main post office is in Castries.

Castries is the birthplace of Arthur Lewis, winner of the 1979 Nobel Memorial Prize in Economics, as well as of Derek Walcott, winner of the 1992 Nobel Prize for Literature.

History
In 1650, the fort auprès du Petit Cul-de-Sac et de la rivière du Carénage was founded by a group of 40 Frenchmen led by de Rousselan, when St. Lucia was purchased by Capt. du Parquet and Monsieur Houel from the French West India Company. The capital was moved to the south side of the harbor in 1769 by Gov. Baron de Micoud. In 1785, the village of Carénage was renamed Castries, after Charles Eugène Gabriel de La Croix, marquis de Castries, the French Minister of the Navy and Colonies.

In 1835, the British built the western wharf in 1642 to facilitate the coal trade and the first steamship arrived in 1841, the RMS Solway.

During World War II on 9 March 1942, the German U-161 sailed into Castries harbor at night and sank two allied ships, including the Canadian ocean liner RMS Lady Nelson, which was subsequently refloated in the harbour and taken to Canada to be converted to a hospital ship.

Castries has been rebuilt many times, following major fires on 15 October 1805, 6 April 1813, and most notably on 19 June 1948.

Tourism

One of the major tourist areas in St. Lucia, Castries is a port of call for cruise ships. They dock at Pointe Seraphine, to the north of the harbour.

Landmarks include the Cathedral of the Immaculate Conception, Derek Walcott Square (renamed from Columbus Square to honor the island's Nobel Prize-winning poet, Derek Walcott), the City Library, the Government House, and Fort Charlotte, at the top of Morne Fortune (an  hill). Beaches include Vigie Beach, Malabar Beach, Choc Beach, and La Toc Beach.

Transport 
Castries is served by George F. L. Charles Airport. Passengers on longer flights arrive at Hewanorra International Airport, near Vieux-Fort. The drive between Hewanorra and Castries can take an hour and a half. Helicopter service between the airports shortens travel time.

Ferries run between Castries and Fort-de-France, Martinique. Yachts may dock in Castries, though they must clear customs first. When the customs area is full, yachts must anchor at the quarantine dock to wait; those that do not are fined. Afterward, yachts may anchor in front of Castries Town or Vigie Creek.

Standard bus routes run from Castries to all outlying districts on the island. The buses are private (not subsidized by government) bearing green license plates with numbers that start with an M—for example, M456. The buses line up in designated areas to pick up passengers. The bus fronts displays a route band, a luminescent sign that indicates which part of the island the bus is traveling to.

Political institutions
As well as being the capital city of Saint Lucia, Castries hosts the secretariat of the Organisation of Eastern Caribbean States. Castries also hosts the headquarters of the Eastern Caribbean Supreme Court.

In October 2008, the American Chamber of Commerce, Saint Lucia, was established. The establishment of a chamber was encouraged by the U.S. Embassy, Barbados. Hugh W. Jones was elected and installed as its first president.

The mayor of Castries is Geraldine Lendor-Gabriel, who took office in September 2021.

A number of international embassies and consulates keep their headquarters in Castries. They include the Organization of American States, British High Commission, Mexican Embassy, embassy of the Republic of China (Taiwan) (in Rodney Bay), Dominican Republic Consulate, French Embassy, Italian Vice Consulate, Jamaican Consulate, Netherlands Consulate, Norwegian Consulate, Brazilian Embassy and Venezuelan Embassy.

See also
Organisation of Eastern Caribbean States
Eastern Caribbean Supreme Court

References

External links

Interactive tour of St. Lucia's History and Culture: Official site for St. Lucia Tourist Board
Worldaware Lesson plan on Castries: site owned by SOS Charity UK

 
Towns in Saint Lucia
Capitals in the Caribbean
Populated places established in 1650
Martinique–Saint Lucia border crossings
Port cities in the Caribbean
1650 establishments in the French colonial empire
1650 establishments in North America
Populated coastal places in Saint Lucia